Esase Bontefufuo  is a town located at the Amansie-West District in the Ashanti Region of Ghana. The town is known for the  Esase Bontefufuo Secondary School.  The school is a second cycle institution.

References

Populated places in the Ashanti Region